'Humanity EP' is an EP by New York City synthpop duo Shy Child. It was released in 2003 on Grenadine Records.

It was a step in a new direction for the band, who had previously produced progressive electronica. This EP is much more synthpop influenced.

Track listing
 'You're All Aglow'
 'Dawn To Dust'
 'Anywhere'
 'Sting Ray Wings'

2003 EPs
Shy Child albums